Grace Hamilton (born 4 April 1992) is an Australian rugby union and rugby league footballer who captains the Australia Wallaroos and the NSW Waratahs in the Super W.

In 2020, she played rugby league for the Sydney Roosters in the NRL Women's Premiership.

Background
Hamilton was born in Orange, New South Wales and raised in Panuara. She began playing rugby union as a university exchange student in the United States.

Playing career

Rugby union
In 2014, Hamilton played for the ACT Brumbies and the University of Sydney. In 2016, Hamilton made her Test debut for Australia on their tour of New Zealand.

In 2017, Hamilton represented Australia at the 2017 Women's Rugby World Cup in Ireland, where Australia finished in sixth place.

In 2018, Hamilton was a member of the NSW Waratahs inaugural Super W-winning squad, starting in their final win over the Queensland Reds. She was later a member of the Waratahs' victorious 2019 and 2020 Super W sides.

Hamilton was named in Australia's squad for the 2022 Pacific Four Series in New Zealand. She later made the Wallaroos squad for a two-test series against the Black Ferns at the Laurie O'Reilly Cup. She was selected in the team again for the delayed 2022 Rugby World Cup in New Zealand.

Rugby league
On 23 September 2020, due to the cancellation of a number of rugby union Tests due to the COVID-19 pandemic, Hamilton switched to rugby league, joining the Sydney Roosters NRL Women's Premiership team. 

In Round 2 of the 2020 NRL Women's season, she made her debut for the Roosters in a 22–12 win over the New Zealand Warriors. On 25 October 2020, she came off the bench in the Roosters' 10–20 Grand Final loss to the Brisbane Broncos.

References

External links
Sydney Roosters profile
Wallaroos Profile

1992 births
Living people
Australian female rugby union players
Australia women's international rugby union players
Rugby union flankers
Australian female rugby league players
Rugby league props
Sydney Roosters (NRLW) players